The Eskimo potato is a type of edible plant that grows in the northern areas of Canada and Alaska. The plant's scientific name is variously attributed as either Claytonia tuberosa (Inuit: oatkuk) or Hedysarum alpinum (Inuit: mashu). Both species have a range in the northern area of North America, have edible roots, and have been documented to have been used as a food source by Inuit.  Due to its nutritional qualities, the eskimo potato is one of many edible foods listed in survival guides, such as the US Army's field manual Survival, and is used in modern times to subsist in nature.

Christopher McCandless used the plant as a food source in the Alaska wilderness.

References

Inuit cuisine
Potatoes
Plant common names